20 Below is the debut solo studio album by American hip hop recording artist MC Breed from Flint, Michigan. It was released on May 12, 1992 via Wrap Records and S.D.E.G. Records with distribution by Ichiban Records. Recording sessions took place at Silver Sun Recording Studio in Flint with producers DJ Flash and Bernard Terry. It features guest appearances from Chuck Nyce and Night & Day.

The album peaked at #155 on the Billboard 200, at #40 on the Top R&B/Hip-Hop Albums chart and at #6 on the Heatseekers Albums chart in the United States. It spawned three singles: "Ain't to Be F...ed With", "Ain't Too Much Worried" and "No Frontin' Allowed". The first two singles from the album made it to the Hot Rap Songs chart – "Ain't to Be Fucked With" reached #14, while "Ain't Too Much Worried" reached #12.

Track listing

Personnel
Eric Tyrone Breed – performer, arranger (tracks: 6, 10)
Chuck Nyce – performer (track 8)
Tonyatta Martinez – backing vocals (tracks: 6, 10)
Gasner Hughes – backing vocals (tracks: 6, 10)
Bernard Ricardo Terry – backing vocals (track 1), guitar (track 4), producer (tracks: 1-4, 6, 8, 10), co-producer (track 7), mixing, recording
DJ Flash – producer (tracks: 1-5, 7, 9, 11-13), co-producer (tracks: 8, 10)
Nimbus – mastering
Peter Morada – art direction, design
Andrew Wilson – photography

Charts

Weekly charts

Year-end charts

References

External links

20 Below by MC Breed on iTunes

1992 albums
MC Breed albums